Speed with Guy Martin is a British documentary series for Channel 4,  presented by Guy Martin, and narrated by Shaun Dooley.

The four-part program sees motorcycle racer and mechanic Guy Martin attempt to create four speed-based challenges that enable him to explore the boundaries of physics and learn about the science of speed. Whether it's slip-streaming a racing driver to ride a bicycle at more than 100 mph using pedal power, or seeing if he can ride a motorbike across a lake, Martin seeks to find out what makes things go fast by getting his hands dirty in a range of unique engineering projects. Along the way celebrities well-known in the world of speed help him in his challenges.

Episodes

Series overview

Series 1 (2013–14)

Series 2 (2014)

Series 3 (2016)

Special episodes

Home media 
On 8 June 2015, a boxset entitled Complete Speed with Guy Martin was released on DVD and Blu-ray in DVD region 0. It was composed of the first two series as a 2-disc box set.

Notes

References 

2013 British television series debuts
British non-fiction television series
Channel 4 original programming
Television series by All3Media